Valentina Mikhailovna Chebotareva (8 April 1960) is a Russian figure skating coach.

Biography
She was born on 8 April 1960. Works in Sports school in St. Petersburg.

Her team participated in major international competitions. In particular, the skater Mikhail Kolyada is a silver medalist of the 2018 Winter Olympics (team competitions) and a bronze medalist of the World Championship 2018; Stanislava Konstantinova a participant of the World Championship (2018) and bronze medalist of the Winter Universiade (2019).

References

External links
Valentina Chebotareva about her skaters Konstantinova and Kolyada

1960 births
Living people
Figure skaters from Saint Petersburg
Russian figure skating coaches
Female sports coaches